Daniel Coll (born 1961) is an English actor and film director best known for playing the recurring character DI Frank Blackmore in ITV's Emmerdale.

Education 
Coll trained at Mountview Academy of Theatre Arts.

Coll is a graduate of Sheffield Hallam University with an MA in Filmmaking.

Career 
Coll has previously made frequent appearances in Coronation Street and Heartbeat. He was in Mel Gibson's Braveheart. Daniel Coll was one of the original dads in Billy Elliot the Musical in London's West End and played Tim in the movie Bullseye; he was also Enjolras in Les Misérables on the UK tour 1992/4. He is also a director and producer and co wrote the musical Pinocchio starring Liam Mower. Coll made his film directorial debut with The Tragedy of Macbeth released in 2012 starring Oliver Tobias and which won for him Best Director in the Los Angeles Independent Film Festival 2012. Coll appeared at the Cheltenham Literature Festival on 9 October 2012 to discuss The Tragedy of Macbeth, following a premiere of the film.

As of 2022, Coll owns Picture Point Films, as a director. The company is working on Gemini, Rural Cut, Gibraltar the Untold Story and The Rose.

Filmography

References

External links

1959 births
Alumni of the Mountview Academy of Theatre Arts
Living people
English male soap opera actors
English male musical theatre actors